A rhapsody in music is a one-movement work that is episodic yet integrated, free-flowing in structure, featuring a range of highly contrasted moods, colour, and tonality. An air of spontaneous inspiration and a sense of improvisation make it freer in form than a set of variations.

In the 18th century, literary rhapsodies first became linked with music, as in Christian Friedrich Daniel Schubart's Musicalische Rhapsodien (1786), a collection of songs with keyboard accompaniment, together with a few solo keyboard pieces. The first solo piano compositions with the title, however, were Václav Jan Tomášek’s fifteen Rhapsodies, the first of which appeared in 1810. Although vocal examples may be found as late as Brahms's Alto Rhapsody, Op. 53 (1869), in the 19th century the rhapsody had become primarily an instrumental form, first for the piano and then, in the second half of the century, a large-scale nationalistic orchestral "epic"—a fashion initiated by Franz Liszt. Interest in Romani violin playing beginning in the mid-19th century led to a number of important pieces in that style, in particular by Liszt, Antonín Dvořák, George Enescu, Ernő Dohnányi, and Béla Bartók, and in the early 20th century British composers exhibiting the influence of folksong composed a number of examples, including Ralph Vaughan Williams's three Norfolk Rhapsodies, George Butterworth's A Shropshire Lad, and Frederick Delius's Brigg Fair (which is subtitled "An English Rhapsody").

Some familiar examples may give an idea of the character of a rhapsody:

Hugo Alfvén, Swedish Rhapsody No. 1 (Midsommarvaka), for orchestra
Béla Bartók, Rhapsody No. 1 and Rhapsody No. 2 for violin and piano (also arranged for orchestra)
Johannes Brahms, Two Rhapsodies, Op. 79, and Rhapsody in E-flat major, Op. 119, No. 4, for solo piano
Emmanuel Chabrier, España, rhapsody for orchestra
Claude Debussy, Première rhapsodie for clarinet and piano (also orchestrated by the composer)
Claude Debussy, Rhapsody for alto saxophone and orchestra
Ernő Dohnányi, Four Rhapsodies, Op. 11, for solo piano
George Enescu, Romanian Rhapsodies Nos. 1 and 2, for orchestra
Edward German, Welsh Rhapsody, for orchestra
George Gershwin, Rhapsody in Blue, Second Rhapsody, for piano and orchestra
James P. Johnson, Yamekraw—A Negro Rhapsody
Herbert Howells, Three Rhapsodies, Op. 17, for solo organ
Franz Liszt, Hungarian Rhapsodies for solo piano
David Popper, Hungarian Rhapsody
Sergei Rachmaninoff, Rhapsody on a Theme of Paganini, Op. 43, for piano and orchestra
Maurice Ravel, Rapsodie espagnole, for orchestra
Ralph Vaughan Williams, Norfolk Rhapsody No. 1, for orchestra
Pancho Vladigerov, Bulgarian Rhapsody "Vardar"

In 1975, the British rock band Queen released "Bohemian Rhapsody", a bombastic mock-operatic rock song which is in the form of a four-part suite, but performed with rock instrumentation. Though described by its composer Freddie Mercury as a "mock opera", it has also been characterized as a "sort of seven-minute rock cantata (or 'megasong') in three distinct movements". It became one of the UK's best-selling singles of all time.

See also

Fantasia (music)
Potpourri (music)

References

 
 
 
 
 
 
 
 
 
 
 
 
 

 
Classical music styles